What's In The Fridge? (Chinese: 冰箱的秘密) is a variety cooking show produced by Mediacorp Channel 8. It is hosted by three of a rotating team of four hosts consisting of Mark Lee, Vivian Lai, Chua En Lai and Pornsak. The cooking show engages contestants in a healthy cooking competition, using food ingredients found in designated refrigerators.

Segments
盲选ABC
挑选冰箱123

Guests

First season (2016)

Contestants

See also
Mediacorp Channel 8

References

Cooking television series
2016 Singaporean television series debuts
2016 Singaporean television series endings
Channel 8 (Singapore) original programming